Black Island is a jagged and rocky islet in south-eastern Australia.  It is part of the Hibbs Pyramid Group, lying close to the central western coast of Tasmania.

Flora and fauna
The only vegetation comprises a few small patches of Senecio sp. at the north-western end.

References

Notes

Sources
 Brothers, Nigel; Pemberton, David; Pryor, Helen; & Halley, Vanessa. (2001). Tasmania’s Offshore Islands: seabirds and other natural features. Tasmanian Museum and Art Gallery: Hobart. 

Islands of Tasmania